James Long (1880 – after 1907) was a Scottish professional footballer who played as an inside forward.

References

1880 births
Footballers from Glasgow
Scottish footballers
Association football inside forwards
Clyde F.C. players
Grimsby Town F.C. players
Reading F.C. players
Derby County F.C. players
English Football League players
Year of death missing